Chris Gildon (born 1971) is an American politician serving as the State Senator for Washington's Washington's 25th legislative district. Prior to his service in the Senate, Gildon served one term in the Washington House of Representatives from 2019 to 2021.

Early life and career

Chris earned a bachelor's degree in political science from the University of Texas. He also holds a master's degree in public administration from Webster University and a master of strategic security studies from the National Defense University.

Gildon is a veteran of the United States Army, having served for 23 years. While serving in the Army, Gildon was deployed overseas five times and was awarded a bronze star medal twice.

Legislative career

His committee and leadership assignments are as follows as of 2023:

 Deputy Leader, Senate Republican Caucus
 Assistant Ranking Member, Ways and Means Committee
 Housing Committee
 Business, Financial Services, Gaming and Trade Committee
 Rules Committee

In addition to his legislative committee assignments, Chris serves as co-chair on the board of directors for the Washington State Institute for Public Policy, which conducts nonpartisan research to inform public policymaking. He also serves on the Joint Committee on Veterans’ and Military Affairs, the Washington State Criminal Sentencing Task Force, and the Legislative-Executive WorkFirst Poverty Reduction Oversight Task Force.

Personal life 
Gildon and his wife, Autumn, live in Puyallup with their two children.

References

External links 
  Chris Gildon at ballotpedia.org
 Chris Gildon at ourcampaigns.com
 Chris Gildon at wastateleg.org
 Chris Gildon at thenewstribune.com (subscription required)

Living people
Republican Party members of the Washington House of Representatives
21st-century American politicians
Republican Party Washington (state) state senators
1971 births